Jessica Tuck is an American actress, best known for her performances on television as Megan Gordon Harrison on the ABC soap opera One Life to Live,  Gillian Gray in the CBS drama series Judging Amy, and as Nan Flanagan on the HBO series True Blood.

Personal life
Tuck was born in New York City and attended Middlesex School. She graduated from Yale University Magna Cum Laude with a BS in Psychology in 1986. She and her husband, Robert Koseff, have a daughter, Samara Barnes Hallam Koseff.

Career
Tuck made her television debut as Megan Gordon Harrison on the ABC daytime soap opera, One Life to Live. She was a regular cast member from 1988 to 1992. She reprised the role in spirit form in 1993, 1999, 2004, and 2012. Tuck was nominated for a Daytime Emmy Award for Outstanding Lead Actress in a Drama Series in 1992 for her role on One Life to Live, but lost the award to her onscreen mother Erika Slezak. In 1990 she also was nominated for a Soap Opera Digest Award for Outstanding Female Newcomer: Daytime for the same role. After leaving daytime television, Tuck played Nicole Brown Simpson in The O.J. Simpson Story (1995) and had a leading role in the Olsen twins' straight-to-video movie Billboard Dad (1998).

From 1999 to 2005, Tuck co-starred opposite Amy Brenneman in the CBS drama series, Judging Amy as Gillian Gray. The series ended after six seasons. She later appeared in a number of films, most notable are Secretary (2002) and Super 8 (2011). She also appeared on  High School Musical 2, High School Musical 3 and Sharpay's Fabulous Adventure as Darby Evans, the mother of Ryan (Lucas Grabeel) and Sharpay (Ashley Tisdale).  In 2008, Tuck was cast in the HBO series True Blood as Nan Flanagan, a vampire who is the spokesperson and 'face' of vampires for the American Vampire League. In season 4, she was promoted to a series regular. She appeared in the series from 2008 to 2011 and made a guest appearance in 2014, in the final season.

During her career, Tuck has made over 50 guest appearances on television shows, including Murder, She Wrote, Seinfeld, NYPD Blue, The Nanny, CSI: Crime Scene Investigation, Grey's Anatomy, Boston Legal, Castle, Private Practice, Revenge, Drop Dead Diva, and Scandal. Tuck also had the recurring roles on Murder One, Sunset Beach, Saving Grace, Days of Our Lives, Grimm, and Twisted.

In 2001, Tuck founded Spark Off Rose, a storytelling event based in Los Angeles. She currently serves as its executive producer/director.

Filmography

Film

Television

References

External links

Actresses from New York City
American film actresses
American soap opera actresses
American television actresses
Living people
Yale College alumni
20th-century American actresses
21st-century American actresses
Middlesex School alumni
Year of birth missing (living people)